Lee Young-hoon (이영훈, 李榮薰, born 1951 in Daegu, South Korea), Lee Yong-hoon, Rhee Yong-hoon, or Yi Yŏnghun is a former professor of economics at Seoul National University and the president of the Naksungdae Institute of Economic Research (낙성대경제연구소).

He is a member and co-representative of the Textbook Forum of the New Right Party. He is known for undertaking new positivistic research on the Economy of Joseon.

Career
Lee graduated from Department of Economics, Seoul University, and attained Doctor of Economics. He was an associate professor of economics at Hanshin University and a professor of Sungkyunkwan University. He was also the winner of the Kyung-Ahm Prize in 2013.

He challenged a common belief in Korea that Japanese colonial rule and development had mistreated Korea, by arguing that the number of comfort women, regarded in South Korea as sex slaves, and forced laborers is exaggerated in Korea's textbooks. After raising doubts by stating that Governor-General of Korea forcibly transported comfort women, he was criticized in South Korea.

Works

See also
New Right (South Korea)
An Byeong-jik
Park Yu-ha

References

External links
 Naksungdae Institute of Economic Research in Korean
Lee Young-Hoon Modern History courses series (in Korean)
 (1) 

1951 births
Living people
People from Daegu
South Korean economists
Academic staff of Seoul National University
Comfort women